The First Baptist Church is a historic church at the junction of Pine and Carruth Streets in Marvell, Arkansas.  It is a large brick masonry structure, with vernacular Collegiate Gothic features.  Its main sanctuary and vestibule area occupy the full width and height of the building, while at the northern end there are two stories of offices.  The building has a flat roof set behind a brick parapet.  Its main facade is divided into three sections, with the main entrance in the western tower-like section.  The central bay has a large wood-frame Gothic window, while the flanking bays both have Gothic-arched windows at the second level.  The congregation was founded in 1877, and this is its second building.  It is the only Collegiate Gothic building in Marvell.

The building was listed on the National Register of Historic Places in 1991.

See also
National Register of Historic Places listings in Phillips County, Arkansas

References

Baptist churches in Arkansas
Churches on the National Register of Historic Places in Arkansas
Churches completed in 1925
Churches in Phillips County, Arkansas
National Register of Historic Places in Phillips County, Arkansas
Collegiate Gothic architecture in Arkansas
1925 establishments in Arkansas
Gothic Revival church buildings in Arkansas